Suntukan is the fist-related striking component of Filipino martial arts. In the central Philippine island region of Visayas, it is known as Pangamot or Pakamot and Sumbagay. It is also known as Mano-mano and often referred to in Western martial arts circles of Inosanto lineage as Panantukan. Although it is also called Filipino Boxing, this article pertains to the Filipino martial art and should not be confused with the Western sport of boxing as practiced in the Philippines. In recent times, suntukan has become a generalized term for any brawls in the Philippines, with the term panantukan becoming more frequently used to denote the actual martial art.

Etymology 
The term suntukan comes from the Tagalog word for punch, suntok. It is the Filipino term for a fistfight, brawl, or boxing. The Visayan terms pangamot and pakamot ("use of hands") come from the Cebuano word for hand, kamot. Due to Cebuano language pronunciation quirks, they are also pronounced natively as pangamut and pakamut, thus the variation of spelling across literature. Mano-mano comes from the Spanish word for "hand", mano, and can translate to "two hands" or "hand-to-hand". The phrase "Mano-mano na lang, o?" ("Why don't we settle this with fists?") is often used to end arguments when tempers have flared in Philippine male society. Filipino Boxing is a contemporary westernized term used by a few instructors to describe suntukan.

Panantukan (often erroneously referred to as panantuken by USA practitioners due to the way Americans pronounce the letters U and A) is a contraction of the Tagalog term pananantukan, according to Dan Inosanto. It is generally attributed to the empty hands and boxing system infused by FMA pioneers Juan "Johnny" Lacoste, Leodoro "Lucky" Lucaylucay and Floro Villabrille into the Filipino martial arts component of the Inosanto Academy and Jeet Kune Do fighting systems developed in the West Coast of the United States. Pananantukan, which Inosanto picked up from his Visayan elder instructors, is a corruption of panununtukan. While the Tagalog of his instructors was not perfect (Lacoste was Waray and the Filipino language based on Tagalog was relatively new when they migrated to the United States), they were highly versed in Filipino martial arts. It is said that originally, Lucaylucay wanted to call his art Suntukan, but he was concerned that it would be confused with Shotokan Karate, so he used the term Panantukan instead.

Characteristics

Striking

Suntukan is not a sport, but rather a street-oriented fighting system. The techniques have not been adapted for safety or conformance to a set of rules for competition, thus it has a reputation as "dirty street fighting".  It mainly consists of upper-body striking techniques such as punches, elbows, headbutts, shoulder strikes and limb destruction. It is often used in combination with Sikaran, the kicking aspect of Filipino fighting which includes low-line kicks, tripping and knee strikes to the legs, shins, and groin. Many of its other unique movesets include elbow blocks, bolo punches and other chopping strikes, evasive maneuvers, and parrying stances.

Suntukan practitioners typically circle constantly to avoid getting hit and look for openings, just like with knife fighting. According to Filipino martial artist Lucky Lucaylucay: "...if your practice is based on knife fighting, you have to become much more sophisticated with your footwork, evasions and delivery because one wrong move could mean death... ...Filipino boxing is exactly like knife fighting, except instead of cutting with a blade, we strike with a closed fist."

Grappling

Panantukan also consists of limb trapping and immobilization, including the technique called gunting (scissors) because of the scissor-like motions used to stop an opponent's limb from one side while attacking from the other side. Suntukan focuses on countering an opponent's strike with techniques that will nullify further attack by hitting certain bones and other areas to cause damage of the attacking limb. Common limb destructions include guiding incoming straight punches into the defending fighter's elbow (siko) to shatter the knuckles.

Dumog or Filipino wrestling is also an essential component of Panantukan. This type of wrestling is based on the concept of “control points” or “choke points” on the human body, which are manipulated – for example: by grabbing, pushing, pulling - in order to disrupt the opponent’s balance and to keep him off balance. This also creates opportunities for close quarter striking using head butts, knees, forearms and elbows. This is accomplished by the use of arm wrenching, shoving, shoulder ramming, and other off-balancing techniques in conjunction with punches and kicks. For example, the attacker's arm could be grabbed and pulled downward to expose their head to a knee strike.

Weaponry

Even though suntukan is designed to allow an unarmed practitioner to engage in both armed and unarmed confrontations, it easily integrates the use of weapons such as knives, palmsticks (dulo y dulo) and ice picks. These weapons can render suntukan's techniques fatal but do not fundamentally change how the techniques are executed. Weapons in suntukan tend to be small, easily concealed and unobtrusive. Thus, suntukan minimizes contact with the opponent because it is not always known whether an opponent is armed, and knives are very often used in fights and brawls in the Philippines. As such, parries and deflections are preferred over blocks and prolonged grappling.

Suntukan is a key component of Arnis and is generally believed to have evolved from the latter. It is theorized to have evolved from Filipino weapons fighting because in warfare, unarmed fighting is usually a method of last resort for when combatants are too close in proximity (such as trapping and grappling range) or have lost their weapons. Aside from this, some unarmed techniques and movements in certain Eskrima systems are directly derived from their own weapon-based forms. In some classical Eskrima systems, the terms Arnis de Mano, De Cadena (Spanish for "of chain") and Cadena de Mano (Spanish for "hand chain") are the names for their empty hand components. Aside from punching, the suntukan components in Eskrima includes kicking, locking, throwing and dumog (grappling).

Usage in sports
A number of Filipino boxing champions have practiced eskrima and panantukan. While many Filipino boxing champions such as Estaneslao "Tanny" del Campo and Buenaventura "Kid Bentura" Lucaylucay (Lucky Lucaylucay's father) practiced Olympic and sport boxing, they also used pangamot dirty street boxing which is distinct from western boxing. 

World champion Ceferino Garcia (regarded as having introduced the bolo punch to the Western world of boxing) wielded a bolo knife in his youth and developed his signature punch from his experience in cutting sugarcane in farm fields with the bladed implement. He himself honed his panantukan in the streets, becoming a known unbeatable street fighter due to his skills. Legendary world champion Gabriel "Flash" Elorde studied Balintawak Eskrima (under founder Venancio "Anciong" Bacon) and got his innovative, intricate footwork from his father, "Tatang" Elorde who was the Eskrima champion of Cebu. Elorde's style was said to have been adopted by many boxers, including his friend Muhammad Ali.

Famous and influential Panantukan practitioners in boxing and mixed martial arts include:
 Ceferino Garcia
 Gabriel Elorde
 Onassis Parungao - First Filipino fighter in the UFC who studied Arnis de Mano
 Eduard Folayang
 Anderson Silva

See also 

 Maharlika
 Timawa
 Juramentado
 History of boxing in the Philippines
 Filipino Martial Arts
 Eskrima
 Sikaran
 Dumog
 Kuntaw
 Kinamutay

References

Further reading
 A Guide to Panantukan, the Filipino Boxing Art, Rick Faye, Cambridge Academy Publishing, 2000

External links
 The Great Pinoy Boxing Era, 1994 documentary on early 1900s Filipino boxing by Corky Pasquil
 Filipino Martial Arts: From Kali and Escrima to Boxing talk at the Smithsonian Museum with Dan Inosanto, Rosie Abriam, Linda España-Maram, Gem Daus

Philippines
Philippine martial arts